Jean Hotte-Duceppe  (1923–1990) was a stage and television actor from Montreal, Quebec.

Born on 25 October 1923 to a family of local shopkeepers in working-class Montreal, Jean Duceppe came to the theatre with no formal training and was completely self-taught. He was popular from the late 1940s until his death at the age of 67 on 7 December 1990. His career debut was at the Arcade, performing seven days a week. Between 1941 and 1947, he performed in 34 different plays. He appeared in more than 160 plays on radio, on television, and in films. In 1971, he won an Etrog from the Canadian Film Awards for best performance by lead actor for his role in the film Mon oncle Antoine.

He hosted radio shows and collaborated on numerous radio and TV series, including the first one broadcast on August 3, 1952, on SRC, Le Seigneur de Brinqueville. Some of his greatest successes were his portrayals of Willy Loman in La Mort d'un commis-voyageur (Death of a Salesman) and Premier Maurice Duplessis in Charbonneau et le chef (Charbonneau and the Chief). He founded the Compagnie de théâtre Jean Duceppe (Jean-Duceppe Company) in 1973. Actor Michel Dumont and Louise Duceppe, one of his daughters, now direct his theatre company.

He supported the yes option in the first Quebec sovereignty referendum in 1980. One of his sons is the Canadian politician Gilles Duceppe, a supporter of the independence of Quebec from Canada and a former leader of the Bloc Québécois.

In 1979, the Government of Quebec awarded Jean Duceppe the Prix Denise-Pelletier. In 1985, he was made a Knight of the National Order of Quebec.

Notes

References

External links
 The Canadian Encyclopedia entry for Jean Duceppe
 

1923 births
1990 deaths
20th-century Canadian male actors
Best Actor Genie and Canadian Screen Award winners
Canadian male radio actors
Canadian male stage actors
Canadian male television actors
Knights of the National Order of Quebec
Male actors from Montreal
New Democratic Party people
Prix Denise-Pelletier winners
Quebec sovereigntists